Marjorie Elliott Sypher de Oduber (24 January 1925 – 16 April 2015) was a Canadian-born Costa Rican musician and public figure. She served as the First Lady of Costa Rica from 1974 to 1978 during the administration of her husband, former President Daniel Oduber Quirós.

Biography 
She was born Marjorie Elliot Sypher in Ottawa, Ontario, Canada, in 1925. She married Daniel Oduber Quirós, the future President of Costa Rica, in 1948.  The couple had two children, Luis Adrian and Ana María. Daniel Oduber died on October 13, 1991, at the age of 70.

Marjorie Elliot Sypher died in San José, Costa Rica, on April 16, 2015, at the age of 90.
Her brother was Fraser Elliott, a prominent Canadian lawyer.

References

1925 births
2015 deaths
First ladies and gentlemen of Costa Rica
Canadian emigrants to Costa Rica
People from Escazú (canton)
People from Ottawa